Soumya, is an Indian name. It is unisexual in nature and is more common as a masculine name in East India and as a feminine name in South and North India. It can also be spelled as Saumya or Somya in South and North India. In West Bengal, it is predominantly a masculine name and spelled as Soumo, Soumya or Soumyo.

The name has various meanings.

Soumya means 'born of Soma'. Soma is Chandra. Soumya is the son of Chandra and therefore means Buddha which is a Sanskrit word that connotes the planet Mercury (planet).

Other meanings of Soumya 
Soumya also means Shubhagrahas or benefics as opposed to Papagrahas or malefic.

Creatures subsisting on leaves & fruits are known as Soumya (benefic), according to The Bṛhat Saṃhitā of Varāha Mihira.

The third year of the ninth Yuga is known as Soumya. According to The Bṛhat Saṃhitā of Varāha Mihira, mankind will be happy during the ‘Soumya’ year.

In Kannada, Soumya means "The Regent of Mercury and son of the Moon.

In  means a mentally calm or placid or balanced; beautiful, majestic, dignified, unruffled.

Soumya is among the "Shiva Sahasranama" – 1008 Names of Lord  Shiva in Shiva Sahasranama Stotram Shiva Purana, Kotirudra Samhita (Book IV), Chapter 35, 1-133.

Soumya is one of the nine regions of Bharatavarsha according to the Brahma Purana. The names of eight of these regions are Indradvipa, Kaserumana, Tamraparna, Gabhastimana, Nagadvipa, Soumya, Gandharva and Varuna.

Soumya is one of the Vasara (days of the week) Wednesday: Soumya Vasara

Notable people with this name 
Soumya Sankar Bose (born 1990), Indian Artist and Photographer 
Soumya Bhattacharya (born 1969), Indian journalist and author
Soumya Raychaudhuri (born 1975), American scientist
Soumya Ranjan Patnaik (born 1952), founder and editor of Oriya daily Sambad 
Soumya Swaminathan (born 1959), Indian paediatrician
Soumya Swaminathan (born 1989), Indian Chess player
Soumya Sarkar (born 1993), Bangladeshi cricketer (previously named Soumya Shanto Sarkar)
S. Sowmya (born 1969), Carnatic musician from Tamilnadu, India

See also 
Soma (disambiguation)
Souma (disambiguation)
Soumyam
Sumaya (given name), an unrelated Arabic name

References 

Indian unisex given names